Genevieve Lyons ( born 5 March 1930, Dublin – 18 October 2018) was an Irish actress, writer, model, radio host and teacher.

Lyons began her theatrical career as Anya in Anton Chekhov's The Cherry Orchard in the Peacock Theatre directed by Brendan Smith. She also performed in work directed by Hilton Edwards "The Man Who Came to Dinner" with Milo O'Shea, Jimmy O'Dea and Maureen Potter (Lorraine Sheldon) and the Victorian musical "The Drunkard" as Michael MacLiammoirs' distraught wife. She worked for Lord Longford's company in the Gate Theatre  mainly in Restoration comedy, Farquars "The Beau Strategist" and "The Broken World" by French philosopher Gabrielle Marceau who selected her for the lead part.

She was a founder member of the Globe Theatre Dublin with her husband Godfrey Quigley and the actors Michael O'Herlihy, Pamela Duncan and Norman Rodway.

She played the juvenile lead in the first play "The Seventh Step" written by of Padrig Fallon.  She continued as a leading lady in all The Globes productions mainly opposite Norman Rodway. She was part of the troupe's attempt to stage an Irish homecoming revival for Richard Harris through a production of The Ginger Man, which closed after three performances due to opposition by the Archbishop because of the play's depiction of sexuality and comments about religion. She acted leads in the Arts Theatre run by Toto Cogley in "Crime Passionelle" by Albert Camus, as well as others by Gerhart Hauptmann and Tennessee Williams. She also played in the review in the Park Theatre a topical comedy show.

She worked with the BBC drama company and hosted a programme on Radio Éireann. She appeared in roles on television in The Avengers (Episode: "Please don't feed the animals", 1961)  Confession (1970) and the film Stork Talk  (1962) as the receptionist.

She appeared as the poster girl for Pond's cold cream.

She later began a career as a writer with novels that include Summer in Dranmore and Demara's Dream.

She taught primary school children for 15 years whilst her daughter was being educated.

Publications

 The Drowning of Alison Alyward (2001) Five Star (ME) 
 Alice's Awakening (2000) Severn House Publishers Ltd 
 Danielle's Decision (1999) Chivers 
 Perdita's Passion (1998) Macmillan Library Reference 
 The Other Cheek (1998) Little Brown 
 The Perfect Family (1998) Little Brown 
 Lucy Leightons Journey (1997) Severn House Publishers Ltd 
 The Lovely American (1996) Little Brown & Company 
 Poppy Penhaligons Progress (1996) Severn House 
 Foul Appetite (1995) Sphere 
 Summer in Dranmore (1994) Sphere 
 Demara's Dream (1994) Little Brown 
 The Palucci Vendetta (1992) Warner 
 Zara (1990) Sphere 
 A House Divided (1990) Sphere 
 Dark Rosaleen (1989) Sphere 
 Green Years (1988) Sphere 
 The Last Inheritor (1987) Pinnacle 
 Slievelea (1987) Sphere

References

External links 
 

2018 deaths
1930 births
Actresses from Dublin (city)
Irish writers